Kaitlin Fletcher (born June 15, 1997), known under the name Bali Baby, is an American rapper based out of Atlanta, Georgia. In 2018 i-D magazine described Bali Baby as "one of very few openly gay female rappers with any skin in the game." 
In March 2018, LA Weeklys Shirley Ju described Bali Baby as "the hottest female rap artist to come out of Atlanta."

Career
Her career as a rapper began in 2016 when she produced the freestyle rap song "Designer". Her breakthrough mixtape was Bali's Play 2, which was released in 2017. On March 30, 2018, she released the five-track EP Bali Blanco, which represented her sixth release overall. Her debut studio album, Baylor Swift, was released in May 2018. It features a more distorted, rock-centered sound than most of her previous work. She has been named as an influencer by ppcocaine.

Discography

Studio albums

Mixtapes

EPs

Singles

As a lead artist

As featured artist

References

Living people
Rappers from Atlanta
African-American women rappers
People from Jacksonville, North Carolina
Bisexual musicians
LGBT rappers
21st-century American rappers
21st-century American women musicians
American LGBT musicians
1997 births
LGBT people from Georgia (U.S. state)
LGBT people from North Carolina
20th-century American LGBT people
21st-century American LGBT people
21st-century African-American women
21st-century African-American musicians
21st-century women rappers